William Garside (26 February 1872 – 2 October 1951) was a Scottish footballer who played in the Football League for Bury.

References

1872 births
1951 deaths
Scottish footballers
Footballers from Glasgow
English Football League players
Scottish Football League players
Association football forwards
Third Lanark A.C. players
Bury F.C. players
Arthurlie F.C. players
Thornliebank F.C. players